The men's team horizontal bar was the second of eight gymnastics events on the Gymnastics at the 1896 Summer Olympics programme. It was conducted on 9 April. Only one team, from Germany, competed.

Background

This was the only appearance of the event, which was one of two team apparatus events contested at the 1896 Games (along with a team parallel bars competition).

Competition format

There were 10 horizontal bars made available to the teams. However, there was apparently no limit on the size of the teams, as one team in the parallel bars competition exceeded 30 members. The German team in the horizontal bar had 10 competing members. Judges scored the routines on execution, rhythm, and technical difficulty.

Schedule

The men's team parallel bars was held in the afternoon of the fourth day of events. It was the third event of the afternoon, following the 800 metres (which began at 2:30 p.m.) and team parallel bars.

Results

References

Sources
  (Digitally available at )
  (Excerpt available at )
 

Men's z team horizontal bar
Team 1896